Tchavdar Georgiev is a writer, producer, director and editor of films, TV commercials and television both in the US and abroad.

Background
Georgiev received an MFA degree from the USC School of Cinematic Arts and a BFA from the School of the Art Institute of Chicago. He is a recipient of National Endowment for the Arts and Open Society Institute grants.

Film
Together with Amanda Pope, Georgiev wrote, produced, and directed The Desert of Forbidden Art. Described by Los Angeles Times critic Kenneth Turan as a "remarkable documentary," the film was nominated for two Emmys and won the Cine Golden Eagle Special Jury Award.  It also received awards at the Palm Beach International Film Festival and the Beijing International Film Festival  The Desert of Forbidden Art premiered on the PBS program Independent Lens, and was broadcast in many countries worldwide.

Georgiev edited the two times Emmy-nominated HBO documentary Valentine Road  as well as the Cinema Eye Honors awarded Finders Keepers, He wrote, co-produced and edited Off The Rails that won awards at Doc NYC and the Newport Beach Film Festival. He wrote and edited Served Like a Girl that premiered at SXSW. He edited Skidrow Marathon, which that premiered at the Los Angeles Film Festival.

Television
Georgiev directed and edited together with Dana Berry for the National Geographic Finding the Next Earth and edited Alien Earths, nominated for a Prime Time Emmy. He was one of the editors on the documentaries We Live in Public (Grand Jury Prize at Sundance), One Lucky Elephant (Best Doc Editing Award at the Woodstock Film Festival) and the Russian narrative feature Bastards (MTV Russia Best Film Award).

Georgiev edited Divining the Human: The Cathedral Tapestries of John Nava, narrated by Edward James Olmos, as well as Marion's Triumph, narrated by Debra Messing which premiered on PBS.  He was a researcher on the Sony Pictures Classics' documentary Red Army that premiered at the Cannes Film Festival and Participant Media's Countdown to Zero.

Georgiev produced the feature thriller Nevsky Prospect for Amazon Studios. He has field produced for USA Network, History Channel, Simon Wiesenthal Center, SF1 (Switzerland), Channel 1 and MTV (Russia). He has line produced commercials for Adobe, Cisco, NASA and TELE2 Mobile Europe and edited for Honda, TELE2 and MTV Russia.

References

External links
 

American documentary filmmakers
American film editors
Living people
USC School of Cinematic Arts alumni
University of Chicago alumni
Year of birth missing (living people)